Edward Lewis "Bob" Bartlett  (April 20, 1904 – December 11, 1968), was an Alaska politician and a member of the Democratic Party.

A key fighter for Alaska statehood, Bartlett served as the Secretary of Alaska Territory from 1939 to 1945, in Congress from 1945 to 1959 as a Delegate, and from 1959 until his death in 1968 as a U.S. senator. He was opposed to U.S. involvement in Vietnam, along with his fellow Senator Ernest Gruening, and also worked to warn people about the dangers of radiation. Many acts bare his name, including a major law known as the Bartlett Act, mandating handicap access in all federally-funded buildings.

Bartlett was born in Seattle, Washington, to Edward C. and Ida Florence (née Doverspike) Bartlett. Bartlett's elder sister, Doris, insisted on calling the young Bartlett 'Bob', which became a name which stuck for life. After attending the University of Washington from 1922 to 1924, Bartlett graduated from the University of Alaska in 1925. Shortly after his graduation, Bartlett began his career in politics. He accepted the position of secretary to Delegate Anthony Dimond of Alaska, serving in that role for a year. Three years later he became the chairman of the Unemployment Compensation Commission of Alaska., serving from 1937 to 1939.

Bartlett's father died in 1935, so he returned to Fairbanks to run his family's mining business. However, Bartlett wasn't fond of mining, and looked back to the political arena in 1938. In 1939, President Franklin D. Roosevelt appointed him Secretary of the Alaska Territory, serving under Governors John Weir Troy & Ernest Gruening. In 1945, following the retirement of Anthony Dimond, Bartlett was elected as the delegate from Alaska to the 79th and the six succeeding Congresses, with the backing of Dimond. It was in this role that his greatest work on Alaskan statehood was completed, such as the introduction of the Alaska Statehood Act to the House, where he was key in shepherding its passage. Bartlett labored constantly for statehood, being a member of the Alaska Statehood Committee.

Upon Alaska's admission to the Union in 1959, he became the senior inaugural U.S. senator from Alaska and served until his death in 1968.

Bartlett died in office on December 11, 1968, due to complications from heart surgery. Republican Ted Stevens was appointed by Governor Walter Hickel. Stevens would serve until 2009, and would serve as Senate President pro tempore from 2003 to 2007.

Early life

Bartlett was born in Seattle, Washington, as Edward Lewis Bartlett, to Edward C. and Ida Florence (née Doverspike) Bartlett. Bartlett's elder sister, Doris, insisted on calling the young Bartlett 'Bob', which became a name which stuck for life. After attending the University of Washington from 1922 to 1924, Bartlett graduated from the University of Alaska in 1925.

Career

Shortly after his graduation, Bartlett began his career in politics. A reporter for the Fairbanks Daily News from 1924 until 1933, he accepted the position of secretary to Delegate Anthony Dimond of Alaska, serving in that role for a year. Three years later he became the chairman of the Unemployment Compensation Commission of Alaska., serving from 1937 to 1939.

Bartlett's father died in 1935, so he returned to Fairbanks to run his family's mining business. However, Bartlett wasn't a big fan of mining, and looked back to the political arena in 1938.

On January 30, 1939, President Franklin D. Roosevelt appointed him secretary of the Alaska Territory, serving under Governors John Weir Troy in 1939 & Ernest Gruening from 1939 to 1944. Bartlett served as acting Governor multiple times, such as during the opening of the Alaska-Canada Highway.

In 1945, following the retirement of Anthony Dimond, Bartlett was elected as the delegate from Alaska to the 79th and the six succeeding Congresses, with the backing of Dimond. It was in this capacity that his greatest work on Alaskan statehood was completed, such as the introduction of the Alaska Statehood Act to the House. Continuing his civic service, he was president of the Alaska Tuberculosis Association and served as a member of the Alaska War Council, from 1942 to 1944.

Bartlett labored constantly for statehood, being a member of the Alaska Statehood Committee. Bartlett, as delegate, was the one who introduced the Alaska Statehood Act into Congress, being key in shepherding it's passage.

Upon Alaska's admission to the Union in 1959, Bartlett became the senior inaugural U.S. senator from Alaska, along with junior Senator Ernest Gruening, with their senior-junior status determined by a coin flip. Bartlett served in this role until his death in office in 1968. He was succeeded by State Representative Ted Stevens, appointed by Governor Hickel, who had lost the Republican primary for Alaska's other Senate seat that year to former Anchorage Mayor Elmer Rasmuson. Stevens had also previously been the 1962 Republican nominee.

Bartlett possessed the reputation of a quiet man of achievement. The Library of Congress estimates that he had more bills passed into law than any other member in congressional history. Before statehood, he was writing legislation (sponsored by other congressional representatives), such as the Alaska Mental Health Enabling Act of 1956. Some of his bills included the Radiation Safety Bill and the Bartlett Act, requiring all federally funded buildings to be accessible to disabled people.

Career as a U.S. senator 

Bartlett was elected as one of Alaska's inaugural Senators along with former Territorial Governor Ernest Gruening in 1958. Bartlett, on account of his service as a Delegate, was nominated as the senior U.S. senator, a decision which upset Gruening. Gruening challenged this, leading to a coinflip. Bartlett won the coinflip, which ended the dispute. Due to a rivalry with Gruening, Bartlett nicknamed Gruening 'Junior' for the rest of his life.

A member of his staff, David Price, later became a U.S. Representative from North Carolina.

In the 1968 Senate race, Bartlett's long-time colleague, Ernest Gruening, was defeated in the Democratic primary by political newcomer and former Speaker of the Alaska House of Representatives, Mike Gravel. Gruening and his supporters launched a write-in campaign against Gravel & Republican nominee, former Anchorage Mayor Elmer Rasumson, who had defeated 1962 nominee Ted Stevens. Gruening fully expected Bartlett's endorsement in the race, as they had worked together for nearly 3 decades. Bartlett put out an official statement in an advert, stating "On August 27th, Alaskans in the primary election chose Mike Gravel as Democratic candidate for the U.S. Senate over Ernest Gruening. The voters spoke." as the ad went on, Bartlett added "I have put personal considerations aside in this decision. The time comes when a man must speak out. I speak out now! I support the Democratic majority. I support Mike Gravel." Gruening was devastated, and couldn't figure out why Bartlett had endorsed Gravel over him.

1964 Alaska earthquake 
Following the 1964 Alaska earthquake, Bartlett was part of the inspection team, and he contributed to efforts to rebuild Anchorage, along with Governor Bill Egan, Representative Ralph Rivers and Senator Gruening. Bartlett & Gruening came into Alaska on Air Force One, thanks to Edward McDermott, Director of the Office of Emergency Planning. President Johnson declared Alaska a 'major disaster area'. Bartlett & Gruening reported the damage back to Johnson, where he sent federal aid.

Fight for Alaskan Statehood

Bartlett first introduced the Alaska Statehood Act in 1947, although the bill was defeated.

Bartlett re-introduced the Alaska Statehood Act in 1950, with the backing of President Harry Truman, although, after passing the House of Representatives by a 40-vote margin, it was killed in committee in the Senate. Bartlett remained unfazed, calling on Alaskans to join his fight for statehood. Alaskans responded with the 1956 constitutional convention, which elected Shadow U.S. Senators William A. Egan & Ernest Gruening, as well as Shadow U.S. Representative Ralph Rivers, all sworn in on October 6, 1956. The convention also created a state constitution for Alaska. The shadow Congressmen's main goal was to request, or demand, Alaskan statehood from the U.S. Congress. The Convention drew national attention to the fight for Alaskan Statehood. With the pressure from the convention & Bartlett, who members of Congress were very fond of, congressmen & other federal politicians rapidly switched their opinions, most notably Sam Rayburn, the powerful Speaker of the House, Senate Majority Leader Lyndon B. Johnson, and President Dwight D. Eisenhower, all of whom had been courted by Bartlett, after previous opposition.

Bartlett was assisted by numerous Alaskans, such as Territorial Governor Mike Stepovich, who was present at the House vote, former Territorial Governor Ernest Gruening, and senior U.S. Department of the Interior official Ted Stevens, who was (illegally) using the Interior's offices to lobby for statehood. After talking to Stevens in 1958, Bartlett remarked in a letter to a friend "At a guess, I should say that many taxpayers' dollars are used for telephone calls to the Interior Department from Alaska and vice versa on matters more political than executive."

In 1958, the bill for Alaska Statehood was re-introduced, backed by Eisenhower, Johnson & Rayburn. The main opponents of the bill were Southern Democrats & Republicans. Republicans feared that Alaska, a Democratic-leaning state, would elect Democrats to Congress. Southern Democrats feared that Alaska, a state with a high native population which had passed one of the first laws against discrimination, would elect pro-civil rights Senators.

The bill would pass the House in April 1958, defeating competition from powerful Virginia Representative & Chair of the House Rules Committee, Howard W. Smith, as well as Washington Representative Thomas Pelly. Bartlett used a powerful procedure, which had been omitted shortly after 1912, due to the fact that the Congress did not plan to add any more states after Arizona. However, the Library of Congress found that the procedure had never been formally abolished. The procedure would've allowed every single Representative to speak on the floor for an hour. Facing the possibility of more than 400 hours of debate, Smith and the other Representatives who were in opposition all backed down. Bartlett was key in shepherding the bill through the Senate, where it passed on June 30, 1958, by a vote of 64–20. Following this, the chamber broke into applause. Bartlett missed this, as he held the promise that he would call back home to Alaska if the bill passed. Bartlett was in his office, calling Alaskans, for most of the night.

President Eisenhower would sign the bill on July 7, 1958, and after the November 25th 1958 elections, in which nearly 80% of eligible Alaskans voted, Bartlett would be elected U.S. Senator, defeating R.E. Robertson. Bartlett would be inaugurated on January 3, 1959, the day that Alaska became a state. Bartlett's part in the Alaska Statehood Act was large, with Sam Rayburn summing up his change in opinion with: "Two words. Bob Bartlett."

Personal life

Death 
Bartlett was a heavy smoker throughout his life, and his health started to fail in the months leading up to his death, with Bartlett receiving treatment for heart ailments. His health failures, despite Bartlett's good spirits, became obvious in campaign ads for Gravel. Bartlett had gone on a vacation to the Caribbean, though couldn't fight off the pain & illness. Eventually, Bartlett & his family decided to get a coronary bypass surgery performed. After the surgery, Bartlett went into cardiac arrest multiple times, but he eventually started to slowly improve, before beginning to decline again. On December 11, 1968, at the age of 64, Bartlett died following the surgery at Cleveland Clinic Hospital in Cleveland, Ohio.

Bartlett died on the same day that Governor Walter Hickel was announced as President-elect Richard Nixon's nominee for U.S. Secretary of the Interior. Despite this, due to the passing of a new law in the Alaska State Legislature, Hickel was able to appoint a Senator from either political party. Bartlett was aware of this, and, before the surgery, left a notice to his physician reading "Don't let your scalpel slip, because the law has changed, and the current Governor, Hickel, will appoint a Republican in my place." Because of this, Hickel appointed the Republican nominee for the 1962 U.S. Senate race, Alaskan statehood activist & former senior executive official Ted Stevens to the seat. Stevens would serve for the following 40 years, serving as President pro tempore.

Bartlett's funeral was held on December 14. He was buried in Northern Lights Memorial Park, Fairbanks, Alaska. Bartlett staffer and state senator Joe Josephson reported that "In some funerals, you feel like people are there out of duty, or to show the flag, however, with Bartlett, it really felt like a friend was lost."

Family
On August 14, 1930, Bartlett married his long-time companion & childhood friend, Vide Gaustad, the daughter of local newspaperman & miner O.P. Gaustad, who was politically active. Their marriage was witnessed by Territorial Senator (and later territorial delegate to the U.S. House) Anthony Dimond, who helped Bartlett further his political career.

Bartlett's daughter, Doris Ann Bartlett, was a literature teacher at the University of Alaska Fairbanks. She also served as the UAF's librarian for the 1956 Alaska Constitutional Convention. She was born February 7, 1934, and she died in 2015.

Bartlett had another daughter, Susie Bernice Bartlett, on December 9, 1940.

Legacy 

On March 27, 1971, the state of Alaska commissioned Felix de Weldon to create a bronze statue of Bartlett which resides in the National Statuary Hall Collection at the United States Capitol. The unveiling ceremony was opened by Alaska's senior U.S. Senator & Bartlett's successor, Ted Stevens. U.S. Senator from Washington Warren Magnuson, Rev. Edward L.R. Elson, U.S. Senator Mike Gravel, U.S. Representative Nick Begich, and Lieutenant Governor Red Boucher all spoke at the unveiling. Magnuson, in tribute, referred to Bartlett as Alaska's "Founding Father", while Rev. Elson praised Bartlett's "high vision, lofty idealism, prodigious energy and sacrificial devotion.", as well as lauding his "enduring statesmanship", and his many legislative & executive achievements.

A substantial number of buildings, place names and more have been named after Bartlett in Alaska over the years. The most notable of these include Bartlett Regional Hospital (originally St. Ann's Hospital, and known for a time as Bartlett Memorial Hospital), the hospital serving Juneau, Alaska, as well as Bartlett High School in Anchorage and Bartlett Hall at the University of Alaska Fairbanks.

Electoral history

As delegate

As U.S. Senator

See also
 List of United States Congress members who died in office (1950–99)
 List of United States senators from Alaska

References

External links

The "Architect of Alaskan Statehood"
Bartlett Regional Hospital home page

|-

|-

1904 births
1968 deaths
20th-century American politicians
Alaska Democrats
Delegates to the United States House of Representatives from Alaska Territory
Democratic Party members of the United States House of Representatives from Alaska
Democratic Party United States senators from Alaska
Politicians from Fairbanks, Alaska
Politicians from Juneau, Alaska
Politicians from Seattle
University of Alaska Fairbanks alumni